Fossi is a surname. Notable people with the surname include:

Francesco Fossi (born 1988), Italian rower
Raffaello Fossi (1928–1962), Italian painter

See also
Dossi
Rossi (surname)